Danniella Westbrook (born 5 November 1973) is an English actress, better known for originating the role of Sam Mitchell in the BBC soap opera EastEnders, playing her on-and-off from 1990 to 2000 and 2009 to 2016. Away from EastEnders, she has presented various series, and was also a contestant on the ITV contest I'm a Celebrity...Get Me Out of Here! in 2003. Westbrook competed in the 2010 series of Dancing on Ice, with US Pairs Skater Matthew Gonzalez, and finished fourth in the competition. In 2013, she appeared in Hollyoaks as Trudy Ryan. In 2016, she took part in the seventeenth series of Celebrity Big Brother, where she reached the final and finished in fifth place. On 27 February of that same year, it was confirmed that Westbrook would return to EastEnders, very briefly with on-screen brother Grant (Ross Kemp), for the death of their on-screen mother Peggy (Barbara Windsor). In 2022, it was announced that Westbrook would play The Fairy Godmother in a West End adult pantomime of Sinderfella, which occurred on 12 December of that year.

Westbrook had a much publicised cocaine addiction throughout the 1990s and early 2000s, which caused the complete erosion of her nasal septum. She sought treatment, but later relapsed. She was previously married and has two children. She has also released two autobiographies, The Other Side of Nowhere in 2006, and, Faith, Hope and Clarity in 2013.

Early life
Westbrook was born in Walthamstow, London, but grew up in Loughton, Essex. Her father Andy was a cab driver, and later a carpet contractor, while her mother, Sue, was a shop assistant. Her parents were also successful property developers. Westbrook has a younger brother, Jay, and an elder half-brother, Justin, from a previous marriage of her father's. She has commented "I came from a very loving family – you know, 2.4 children with a Volvo".

As a child, she had a keen interest in horse riding, but she has said that she has always had aspirations to be famous. She started off modelling at the age of seven and then progressed to acting. She joined the Sylvia Young Theatre School when she was eight, attending Saturday classes. Throughout the early stages of her career, Westbrook attended a local state primary school, but she was bullied because of her television appearances, and after one bully cut off her hair, Westbrook's parents removed her from the school. She was sent to a local private school, until, at the age of 12, her parents allowed her to attend Sylvia Young Theatre School as a full-time student, where Denise Van Outen, Dani Behr and her future EastEnders co-stars, Nicola Stapleton and Samantha Janus, were among her contemporaries.

Career

Early career
Westbrook started off modelling at the age of seven for the supermarket Asda. She went on to launch Next's children's fashionware, became the face of highstreet store "Tammy Girl", took part in a Weetabix campaign and featured in advertisements for Opel cars and Coca-Cola. Later she did modelling alongside her younger brother Jay. She progressed into acting, appearing as a child thief in Melvyn Bragg's London Programme and the West End production of Joseph and the Amazing Technicolor Dreamcoat. She appeared in the music video for the song "The Invisible Man" by Queen and had a minor role in Grange Hill. At the age of eleven she appeared as an extra in BBC soap opera EastEnders, roller skating across the soap's setting of Albert Square. At the time her local paper published her picture with the punchline "who knows, one day she may be the show's star!".

EastEnders
At the age of 16, Westbrook was put forward for a much bigger role in EastEnders, Sam Mitchell (the younger sister of Phil and Grant). Her audition was successful and  her first appearance on EastEnders was aired in July 1990. Despite featuring in some prominent storylines, Westbrook decided to leave the soap in 1993 to take on another role. In 1995, the producers at EastEnders asked her back to the soap a second time. However, Westbrook was regularly using cocaine and it began to affect her work. Due to her off-screen difficulties and her poor and tardy attendance on set, the producers of EastEnders terminated her contract and she was written out of the soap again in 1996.

In 1999, EastEnders producers decided to reintroduce the character of Sam Mitchell. Although they initially considered recasting the role to another actress, and despite all her past problems, they decided to give Westbrook another chance and she was asked back for a third time. During her time away, her heavy use of cocaine had completely eroded her nasal septum. To hide this from the viewers, she was only filmed in ways that would keep her septum hidden from view. However, Westbrook's drug taking had not ended and in 2000, she was asked to leave EastEnders again. In 2001, the character of Sam Mitchell was reintroduced, but due to Danniella's personal issues, producers decided to recast. Kim Medcalf became the second actress to play Sam Mitchell, appearing from 29 January 2002 until 17 November 2005 and from 18 April 2022 onwards.

In April 2009, the media confirmed that EastEnders bosses were reintroducing the character of Sam Mitchell, and that Westbrook would be reprising the role, not Kim Medcalf. Westbrook returned to screens in September 2009 for two temporary stints, departing once again on 7 January 2010 and 21 September 2010. Westbrook again reprised the role of Sam for four episodes airing between 30 June and 8 July 2016. When producers decided to reintroduce the character of Sam in 2022 they opted to bring Medcalf back and not Westbrook.

Other work
A week after her initial exit from EastEnders, in 1993, Westbrook was cast in the part of Dawn in the ITV show Frank Stubbs Promotes, which had a second series in 1994. She also played a part in Dave Stewart's short film directorial debut, Entertaining Mr. Simpson. The film was shown at various film festivals around the world, including Cannes.

In 2003, Westbrook was a contestant in the second series of British ITV reality television show I'm a Celebrity...Get Me Out of Here!. Despite being a popular candidate for winning, she found the environment traumatic, saying that she missed her children and wasn't psychologically prepared for the hardship of the jungle life. She quit the show after nine days, before being voted off.

In 2006, Westbrook appeared on a reality TV special of The Weakest Link where she lost in the head-to-head final round. Still, she won £5,025 after Martin Offiah decided to split the winnings, which were donated to charity.

Westbrook was reportedly offered the role of Natalie Buxton in the ITV prison series Bad Girls, but she declined because of her nose rebuilding operation. Dannielle Brent went on to play Natalie Buxton. Westbrook also turned down a small role in Footballers Wives and the role of money grabber Suzie Samson in ITV soap opera Crossroads. Emma Noble went on to portray Suzie Samson.

Westbrook, who has admitted to having breast enhancements,—co-presented Cosmetic Surgery Live alongside Vanessa Feltz. Danniella has also presented and starred in a series of fitness DVDs. She has appeared in the reality series I'm Famous and Frightened! and Most Haunted, as well as the television comedy sketch show Bo' Selecta. In addition, she presented Derek Acorah's Ghost Towns with Derek Acorah on LIVINGtv.

Westbrook has featured in several documentaries, including an interview with British journalist Martin Bashir for the Tonight with Trevor McDonald show and Danniella Westbrook: My Nose and Me for Channel 4. In April 2006, Danniella released an autobiography entitled The Other Side of Nowhere, which gives a depiction of her struggles with cocaine.

Danniella competed in the fifth series of Dancing on Ice and was partnered by newcomer professional Matthew Gonzalez in 2010. She was eliminated from the show in the semi-finals, placing fourth overall. In 2013, she appeared in Channel 4 teen soap opera Hollyoaks as an instalment of a storyline, which saw Westbrook's character Trudy Ryan hire Jacqui McQueen (Claire Cooper) and Theresa McQueen (Jorgie Porter). In 2014, she appeared in the Vigilante Film 'Mob Handed'. She was due to reprise her role as Trudy on Hollyoaks in 2015, however this was cancelled with a representative from Hollyoaks claiming that she "breached her contract".

On 5 January 2016, she entered the Celebrity Big Brother house to take part in the seventeenth series. On 5 February, Westbrook reached the final and finished in fifth place. Since her appearance on Celebrity Big Brother she has appeared on Loose Women and This Morning, followed by a brief return to EastEnders. 

Westbrook has not performed for film or television since mid 2016. In December of that year, she began DJing.

In February 2019, Westbrook embarked on a career as a motivational speaker, speaking to international crowds at several shows of 'Yes You Can – Inspired to Achieve' at London's Earl's Court.

In October 2022, it was reported that Westbrook would star in a West End adult pantomime, titled Sinderfella. She played The Fairy Godmother for one-night only, on 12 December 2022, in The Prince of Wales Theatre, Drury Lane.

Personal life

Drug addiction

Westbrook's struggle with cocaine addiction has been widely documented in the British press and media. She has confessed that she first tried the drug at the age of 14, in a nightclub. After winning her role in EastEnders at the age of 16, Westbrook was a regular on the London club scene, and her cocaine usage escalated. She has commented 'I was always in clubs and everyone was doing coke and it was glamorous – except obviously, it wasn't at all. I was just very young, very stupid and very easily led...I think there should be someone at EastEnders to say to young people when they come in, 'Look, your life is about to change, you're going to be invited places, and you'll be offered drugs.' Someone who can tell them what sort of people are about, and what sort of papers, and how quickly what you've worked for all those years can be gone.' Westbrook has estimated that she has spent over £250,000 on drugs, used five grams of cocaine every day throughout her first pregnancy, and has admitted that during her lowest ebb she attempted suicide several times.

In May 2000, Westbrook was photographed at the British Soap Awards, where an image of her missing columella (the skin at the end of the 
septum which separates the nostrils) was given to a series of tabloid newspapers, unveiling her secret and highlighting her improper drug use. Westbrook was checked into rehab and, six months later, she appeared on the Channel 4 programme The Priory with the claim that she was clean and had been free from drugs for months. However, hosts Jamie Theakston and Zoë Ball struggled to get coherent answers from Westbrook, who was clearly under the influence of drugs despite her claims of abstinence. Reflecting back on the event in 2002, Westbrook commented "I said I was clean, but it was obvious I wasn't. I looked about 50, and my voice was shaky. I should never have been allowed on. They wanted to laugh at me, rip me apart. I despise that sort of thing, but it did me the world of good because watching it I realised, 'I'm so ill.' When it came to the crunch I thought, 'Hang on. I don't want to die.'" She re-entered rehab to try to kick her drug habit. Westbrook has since undergone reconstructive surgery on her nose, to replace her eroded septum and columella.

In 2013, Westbrook revealed in an interview that she had been kidnapped and gang-raped by drug dealers during the period she was addicted.

In 2019, Westbrook appeared on The Jeremy Kyle Show to talk about her continued drug use, and it was arranged for her to enter drug rehabilitation. Westbrook said on Channel 5's Jeremy Vine that Kyle's intervention had saved her life.

Relationships and family
During the 1990s, Westbrook began dating East 17 lead singer Brian Harvey from 1991 to 1995.

Westbrook then dated Robert Fernandez. Their son was born 23 November 1996.

In 1998, Westbrook was involved in a car accident which left her with severe facial injuries, including a dislocated eye. She was flung through the car windscreen but survived, and after corrective surgery had no long-term or major disfigurement.

After splitting with Fernandez, Westbrook married van driver Ben Morgan in 1998 after knowing him for eight weeks. The couple moved to Australia, but the marriage ended in divorce nine months later.

Westbrook married businessman Kevin Jenkins on 27 December 2001, almost four months after the birth of their daughter on 5 September that year. After appearing on I'm a Celebrity... Get Me Out of Here! in 2003, Westbrook admitted that she no longer wanted to be a 'celebrity', commenting 'I made a pact with Kevin [that] I would do no more TV work that would take me away from home. These days, I live an ordinary life. I work occasionally, but I also do the school run and laundry and prepare my family's dinner.'

Health
In May 2017, Westbrook discussed her mental health on the panel series Loose Women, saying "I have borderline personality disorder, I'm bipolar, [paranoid] schizophrenia, I've got lots of different things".

In August 2018, Westbrook underwent treatment for womb cancer after the disease was misdiagnosed. A year later, she was given the all-clear.

In May 2022, she developed septicaemia due to an undisclosed cause and was admitted to an Intensive Care Unit. She recovered completely following prompt treatment.

Filmography

Theatre credits

See also
 List of Celebrity Big Brother (British TV series) housemates
 List of Dancing on Ice contestants
 List of I'm a Celebrity...Get Me Out of Here! (British TV series) contestants

References

External links
 
 

1973 births
Living people
English soap opera actresses
English television actresses
English film actresses
English television presenters
English television personalities
Alumni of the Sylvia Young Theatre School
People from Loughton
Actresses from London
People from Walthamstow
Converts to Christianity
English Christians
Big Brother (British TV series) contestants
People with bipolar disorder
People with borderline personality disorder
People with schizophrenia
I'm a Celebrity...Get Me Out of Here! (British TV series) participants